Turtleback Falls, also called Umbrella Falls, is a waterfall in Western North Carolina, located near Rosman.  The falls is located on the Horsepasture River in the Pisgah National Forest.  The falls is usually accessed by a hike starting in Gorges State Park which passes through Pisgah National Forest property.

Turtleback Falls is a popular place for swimming and people frequently slide over the falls into the Chug Hole during low water; however, the currents can be dangerous in higher flows and people have drowned at Turtleback, or have been swept downriver and over 125' Rainbow Falls.

Geology
The falls has a large, deep pool at the bottom commonly known as the "Chug Hole". The river flows over a large, sloping slab of rock before curving steeper and finally dropping into the pool. The appearance of the rock, similar to a turtle's shell, gives the falls its name.

Nearby waterfalls
Little Falls - located on private property upstream from Drift Falls
Narrows Falls - located in a gated community upstream from Drift Falls
Rock House Falls - 55-ft falls located on private property on Burlingame Creek, a tributary of the Horsepasture River
Rainbow Falls
Drift Falls
Stairway Falls
Sidepocket Falls
Windy Falls

Notes

External links
Turtleback falls on NCWaterfalls.com

Protected areas of Transylvania County, North Carolina
Waterfalls of North Carolina
Pisgah National Forest
Waterfalls of Transylvania County, North Carolina